South Capitol is a station on the New Mexico Rail Runner Express commuter rail line, located in Santa Fe, New Mexico at 1301 Alta Vista, between St. Francis Drive and Cerrillos Road, near the South Capitol Governmental Complex. It opened to service on December 17, 2008.

The station has free parking, with over 200 spaces. Santa Fe Trails routes 2 and 4 serve the stop. The NMDOT Park and Ride Blue, Red and Orange routes connect the station to Los Alamos, Espanola, and Las Vegas, and a local shuttle transfers passengers to various destinations in Santa Fe. The North Central RTD also serves this station, providing services north toward Española and Taos and south toward Eldorado and Edgewood.

Each of the Rail Runner stations contains an icon to express each community's identity. The icon representing this station is the Zia sun symbol.

External links
Stations, South Capitol Official Rail Runner site

Railway stations in New Mexico
Railway stations in the United States opened in 2008
Buildings and structures in Santa Fe, New Mexico
Transportation in Santa Fe County, New Mexico
2008 establishments in New Mexico